Jay Ali (born 29 March 1980) is a British actor best known for portraying Timothy in Freeform's The Fosters, FBI Agent Rahul "Ray" Nadeem in Daredevil, and Dr. Ethan Shah in Magnum P.I.

Early life
Ali was born in St Albans to Pakistani parents.  He grew up as an avid cricket player, playing frequently throughout his childhood. Ali then developed an interest in acting even after his parents disapproved. He moved to the United States to pursue acting despite having no experience.

Filmography

External links
 
 
 

1982 births
Living people
English people of Pakistani descent
British film actors of Pakistani descent
Male actors from London
21st-century British male actors
British male television actors